The 2016 BRDC British F3 Championship is a motor racing championship for open wheel, formula racing cars held across England and, for the first time, Belgium. The 2016 season will be the first one under the BRDC British F3 denomination. The championship features professional motor racing teams, and will also feature the debut of the new 2-litre 230-bhp Tatuus-Cosworth single seat race car in the main series, a car that was first used in the 2015 BRDC Formula 4 Autumn Trophy. The season will begin at Snetterton 300 on 27 March and will end on 11 September at Donington Park, after eight triple header events for a total of twenty-four races.

Teams and drivers
All teams are British-registered. Both Carlin and Double R Racing will make their debut in the series, along with Fortec who already entered the 2015 BRDC F4 Autumn Trophy.

Race calendar and results
 
The calendar was published on 27 October 2015. The series will support British GT at nearly all events, with the exception being the season-opening Snetterton 300 round. For the first time, the series will travel abroad, having a round at Spa-Francorchamps in Belgium.

Championship standings
Scoring system
Points were awarded to the top 20 classified finishers in all races.

Drivers' championship

2016 BRDC British Formula 3 Autumn Trophy

The 2016 BRDC British Formula 3 Autumn Trophy was a four-race motor racing championship held at Snetterton 300 in England on October 29–30, as an off-season trophy to the BRDC British Formula 3 Championship. The trophy featured a mix of professional motor racing teams and privately funded drivers running the same 2-litre 230-bhp Tatuus-Cosworth single seat race car used in the main championship.

Teams and drivers

All teams were British-registered. Drivers in italics are not eligible for trophy points.

Race calendar and results
The race calendar consisted of a 4-race event held at the Snetterton 300. The weekend format includes a 20-minute qualifying session and two 12-lap races on both Saturday and Sunday. The grid for the first race in each day was set in qualifying order, with starting positions for race two of each day set by the fastest laps from race one.

Due to adverse weather, the Sunday qualifying wasn't held and the two races were shortened to 8 laps. For race 3, the drivers were classified on the grid by championship order. Race 4 was ultimately cancelled due to the conditions worsening.

Trophy standings

Scoring system
Points were awarded to the top 20 classified finishers in all races as follows.

Autumn Trophy

References

External links
 

BRDC British Formula 3 Championship seasons
Brdc Formula 3
Brdc Formula 3
BRDC Formula 3